In geometry, the lune of Hippocrates, named after Hippocrates of Chios, is a lune bounded by arcs of two circles, the smaller of which has as its diameter a chord spanning a right angle on the larger circle.  Equivalently, it is a non-convex plane region bounded by one 180-degree circular arc and one 90-degree circular arc. It was the first curved figure to have its exact area calculated mathematically.

History
Hippocrates wanted to solve the classic problem of squaring the circle, i.e. constructing a square by means of straightedge and compass, having the same area as a given circle.  He proved that the lune bounded by the arcs labeled E and F in the figure has the same area as triangle ABO. This afforded some hope of solving the circle-squaring problem, since the lune is bounded only by arcs of circles. Heath concludes that, in proving his result, Hippocrates was also the first to prove that the area of a circle is proportional to the square of its diameter.

Hippocrates' book on geometry in which this result appears, Elements, has been lost, but may have formed the model for Euclid's Elements. Hippocrates' proof was preserved through the History of Geometry compiled by Eudemus of Rhodes, which has also not survived, but which was excerpted by Simplicius of Cilicia in his commentary on Aristotle's Physics.

Not until 1882, with Ferdinand von Lindemann's proof of the transcendence of π, was squaring the circle proved to be impossible.

Proof
Hippocrates' result can be proved as follows: The center of the circle on which the arc  lies is the point , which is the midpoint of the hypotenuse of the isosceles right triangle .  Therefore, the diameter  of the larger circle  is  times the diameter of the smaller circle on which the arc  lies.  Consequently, the smaller circle has half the area of the larger circle, and therefore the quarter circle  is equal in area to the semicircle . Subtracting the crescent-shaped area  from the quarter circle gives triangle  and subtracting the same crescent from the semicircle gives the lune. Since the triangle and lune are both formed by subtracting equal areas from equal area, they are themselves equal in area.

Generalizations

Using a similar proof to the one above, the Arab mathematician Hasan Ibn al-Haytham (Latinized name Alhazen, c. 965 – c. 1040) showed that where  two lunes are formed, on the two sides of a right triangle, whose outer boundaries are semicircles and whose inner boundaries are formed by the circumcircle of the triangle, then the areas of these two lunes added together are equal to the area of the triangle. The lunes formed in this way from a right triangle are known as the lunes of Alhazen. The quadrature of the lune of Hippocrates is the special case of this result for an isosceles right triangle.

In the mid-20th century, two Russian mathematicians, Nikolai Chebotaryov and his student Anatoly Dorodnov, completely classified the lunes that are constructible by compass and straightedge and that have equal area to a given square. All such lunes can be specified by the two angles formed by the inner and outer arcs on their respective circles; in this notation, for instance, the lune of Hippocrates would have the inner and outer angles (90°, 180°). Hippocrates found two other squarable concave lunes, with angles approximately (107.2°, 160.9°) and (68.5°, 205.6°).
As Chebotaryov and Dorodnov showed, these five pairs of angles give the only constructible squarable lunes; in particular, there are no constructible squarable lenses.

References

Circles
Squaring the circle